Dubki is a rural locality (a village) in Filippovskoye Rural Settlement, Kirzhachsky District, Vladimir Oblast, Russia. The population was 67 as of 2010. There are 20 streets.

Geography 
Dubki is located 14 km southwest of Kirzhach (the district's administrative centre) by road. Shuvalovo is the nearest rural locality.

References 

Rural localities in Kirzhachsky District